Carabus lineatus troberti is a subspecies of green coloured beetle in the family Carabidae that can be found in France and Spain.

References

lineatus troberti
Beetles described in 1840